William P. Keady (April 1, 1852 – September 16, 1917) was an American politician who served in the Oregon House of Representatives. He was chosen to serve as Speaker of that body in 1885 and 1893. He was first elected to the House to represent Benton County in 1882 and served until 1885. In 1892, he was elected once again to the House, this time to represent Multnomah County.

References

Speakers of the Oregon House of Representatives
Republican Party members of the Oregon House of Representatives
1917 deaths
1852 births
Businesspeople from Portland, Oregon
People from Washington County, Pennsylvania
People from Benton County, Oregon
People from Multnomah County, Oregon
19th-century American businesspeople